Anthony Lloyd is a footballer.

Anthony Lloyd may also refer to:

Anthony Loyd (born 1966), English journalist
Tony Lloyd (born 1950), British politician
Tony Lloyd, Baron Lloyd of Berwick (born 1929), British judge
Tony Lloyd (artist) (born 1970), Australian artist
Tony Lloyd (tennis) (born 1956), British tennis player

See also
Tony Lloyd (disambiguation)